"Homer the Heretic" is the third episode of the fourth season of the American animated television series The Simpsons. It originally aired on the Fox network in the United States on October 8, 1992. In the episode, Homer decides to forgo going to church and has an excellent time staying home. His behavior quickly attracts the wrath of God, who visits him in a dream. The chalkboard gag from this episode was a reference to the previous episode "A Streetcar Named Marge", which had made controversial references to New Orleans.

The episode was written by George Meyer and directed by Jim Reardon.

Plot

On a frosty Sunday morning, Marge gathers the family to go to church. Homer refuses to go, much to her annoyance and dismay, after he sees the weather outside and accidentally splits his church pants. He stays behind as he sleeps in late, dances in his underwear, makes his special waffle recipe, wins a radio trivia contest, watches an action-packed football game, and finds a penny. Homer attributes his good fortune to skipping church and declares it the best day of his life. Meanwhile, Marge and the kids shiver their way through the sermon, only to find themselves trapped at the end since the door has frozen shut. The congregation is forced to stay longer while Groundskeeper Willie defrosts the doors, after which Marge discovers her car has broken down.

When Marge and the children finally get home, Homer says that since so many good things have happened to him because he skipped church, he will never go to church again, much to Marge's horror. That night, Marge prays for her husband at their bedside. Homer tries to entice her to join him in bed, but then falls asleep suddenly and has a dream in which God personally appears to him. God is enraged with Homer for forsaking His church, but agrees to let Homer worship in his own way. Homer starts following his own religion tailored to his personal tastes, including holidays he invents to get out of work.

Marge, Reverend Lovejoy and Ned attempt without success to bring Homer back to the congregation. One Sunday morning, while everybody else is at church, Homer falls asleep on the couch smoking a lit cigar, which ignites magazines and ultimately sets the whole house ablaze. Homer wakes up, but is quickly rendered unconscious from smoke inhalation and faints. Apu, chief of Springfield's volunteer fire department, rushes to the Simpson house with other firefighters including Krusty the Clown, Chief Wiggum, and Barney. Meanwhile, Ned runs into the burning house to rescue Homer and pulls him out just as the firefighters arrive. After the fire is extinguished, Homer declares that God was delivering vengeance. Reverend Lovejoy counters that God was working through Homer's friends, despite their different faiths. Homer agrees to give church another chance and the next Sunday is there, yet snoring loudly through the service. God consoles Homer on the failure of his religion and is about to tell him the meaning of life when the credits begin.

Production

This episode originated when Al Jean commented to Mike Reiss, "We had a lot of luck with Homer stealing cable, which was based on the eighth commandment, so maybe we could look to other commandments. So we thought, 'Honor vs the Sabbath' would be a good one. So the 'Homer doesn't go to church' storyline was given to George Meyer." Reiss and Jean thought that as a lapsed Catholic, Meyer would "bring the proper degree of rage" to the episode. Meyer had a lot of fun making the episode, thinking that most people could relate to the bliss of staying home from church. One of the main problems Meyer had writing this episode is that whenever Homer saw God, he had to have fallen asleep so that it appeared to be a dream. Meyer did not want to show that God was literally appearing to Homer. This resulted in him falling asleep so many times during the first draft of the episode that it was almost as if Homer had narcolepsy. This was also the first episode from season four that was read to the production team. Although first reads on previous seasons had not been well received by the production team, "Homer the Heretic" read very well, particularly some of the visuals in the third act, such as the house on fire and Homer being rescued by Flanders.

This was the first episode of The Simpsons where the animation was produced by Film Roman and the first where it was overseas at the newly formed Rough Draft Studios (which founded by Gregg Vanzo, who directed the episode "There's No Disgrace Like Home"). Up until this point, Film Roman had mostly worked on Garfield and Friends and Bobby's World episodes, and were not used to the speed in which The Simpsons episodes were produced. However, they quickly adjusted. As for Rough Draft Studios, they were a brand-new company, and The Simpsons was one of the first shows they ever worked on, along with The Ren & Stimpy Show. Film Roman and Rough Draft went on to animate the show until the former was replaced by Fox Television Animation in 2016, and also would fully collaborate together on The Simpsons Movie in 2007, along with AKOM, which also oversees the show's animation. The latter would also work on Matt Groening's other shows, like Futurama and Disenchantment. Previously, the animation was produced by Klasky Csupo.

The chalkboard gag for this episode, "I will not defame New Orleans", was made as an apology to the citizens of New Orleans after it was musically insulted in the previous episode.

Along with "Mr. Plow", a later episode of this season, this is one of the few television episodes that prominently featured snow outside of Christmas or Thanksgiving centric episodes.

In the scene in which Jimi Hendrix and Benjamin Franklin play a game of air hockey in Heaven, Hendrix was supposed to have a speaking line of his own to respond to Franklin's line. It was cut late during production because the voice actor for Hendrix did not sound enough like Hendrix. Franklin's line was kept because "nobody knows what he sounds like", whereas Hendrix had a distinct voice. The abrupt cutting off of God's voice before he reveals the meaning of life was intended to be cut off by a voice-over promotion for whatever Fox program aired after The Simpsons.

The episode was notable for portraying God as having five fingers on each hand, as opposed to the four fingers of every other Simpsons character. Extensive debate arose in the Simpsons fan community as to the nature and meaning of the design, however on the DVD commentary, Reardon confessed that it was simply a production oversight.

Cultural references
The brand label on Homer's shower radio reads "No-Soap, Radio!", so-named for the punch line of a well-known practical joke. The scene where Homer dances in his underwear to The Royal Teens song "Short Shorts" is almost identical to a scene in the 1983 Tom Cruise film, Risky Business. The burning floor collapsing beneath Flanders' feet is a reference to the film Backdraft, released in 1991.

Reception
In its original broadcast, "Homer the Heretic" finished 36th in ratings for the week of October 5–11, 1992, with a Nielsen rating of 12.0, equivalent to approximately 11.2 million viewing households. It was the second highest-rated show on the Fox network that week, following Married... with Children.

Warren Martyn and Adrian Wood, the authors of the book I Can't Believe It's a Bigger and Better Updated Unofficial Simpsons Guide, loved the episode. They described it as "A brilliant episode, underlining everything that The Simpsons is about. Homer hates church, Marge wants the kids to see Homer as an example, and everyone pulls together in the end. Good stuff, and if God really is like that, he's a groovy kind of guy."

In 2012, HitFix's Alan Sepinwall cited the episode as his favorite of the show, writing that it "captures everything that was and is great about the series: social satire, extraordinary quotability ('This Things I Believe'), a good family story, and an innate sweetness in spite of Homer's outsized antics."

When asked to pick his favorite season out of The Simpsons seasons one through twenty, Paul Lane of the Niagara Gazette picked season four and highlighted "Brother from the Same Planet" and "Mr. Plow" which he called "excellent", along with "the sweetly funny" "Lisa's First Word", and "Homer the Heretic".

In 2004, ESPN.com released a list of the Top 100 Simpsons sport moments, ranking Benjamin Franklin and Jimi Hendrix's air hockey game, a scene from the episode, at #83.

The episode's reference to Risky Business was named the 45th greatest film reference in the history of the show by Total Film's Nathan Ditum.

Dan Castellaneta, the voice of Homer, named it his favorite episode of the show together with "Simpson and Delilah" and "Lisa's Substitute".

When The Simpsons began streaming on Disney+ in 2019, former Simpsons writer and executive producer Bill Oakley named this one of the best classic Simpsons episodes to watch on the service. The writers of the Fox program King of the Hill put "Homer the Heretic" among the five best episodes of The Simpsons, including "Brother from the Same Planet", "Lisa's Wedding", "Lisa's Substitute", and "Behind the Laughter".

References

External links

The Simpsons (season 4) episodes
1992 American television episodes
Fiction about God
Television episodes about religion